Neis is a genus of nudan ctenophores. It is a monotypic genus containing the single species Neis cordigera. It occurs only near Australia. As all beroids, it is a free-swimmer that form part of the plankton.

Neis cordigera is among the largest species in the class, often exceeding  in length. It is somewhat flattened and characterized by a pair of trailing gelatinous "wings" that extend beyond the aboral tip.

Like other comb jellies, the body wall of nudans consists of an outer epidermis and an inner gastrodermis, separated by a jelly-like mesoglea. The mesoglea has pigments that give many nudan species a slightly pink color; Neis cordigera may be yellowish or a deep orange-red. The aboral end is extended into two large lobes and the vascular system is undivided.

References 

Nuda
Monotypic ctenophore genera
Taxa named by René Lesson